This page will attempt to list examples in mathematics.  To qualify for inclusion, an article should be about a mathematical object with a fair amount of concreteness.  Usually a definition of an abstract concept, a theorem, or a proof would not be an "example" as the term should be understood here (an elegant proof of an isolated but particularly striking fact, as opposed to a proof of a general theorem, could perhaps be considered an "example").  The discussion page for list of mathematical topics has some comments on this.  Eventually this page may have its own discussion page.  This page links to itself in order that edits to this page will be included among related changes when the user clicks on that button.

The concrete example within the article titled Rao-Blackwell theorem is perhaps one of the best ways for a probabilist ignorant of statistical inference to get a quick impression of the flavor of that subject.

Uncategorized examples, alphabetized

Alexander horned sphere
All horses are the same color
Cantor function
Cantor set
Checking if a coin is biased
Concrete illustration of the central limit theorem
Differential equations of mathematical physics
Dirichlet function
Discontinuous linear map
Efron's non-transitive dice
Example of a game without a value
Examples of contour integration
Examples of differential equations
Examples of generating functions
Examples of groups
List of the 230 crystallographic 3D space groups
Examples of Markov chains
Examples of vector spaces
Fano plane
Frieze group
Gray graph
Hall–Janko graph
Higman–Sims graph
Hilbert matrix
Illustration of a low-discrepancy sequence
Illustration of the central limit theorem
An infinitely differentiable function that is not analytic
Leech lattice
Lewy's example on PDEs
List of finite simple groups
Long line
Normally distributed and uncorrelated does not imply independent
Pairwise independence of random variables need not imply mutual independence.
Petersen graph
Sierpinski space
Simple example of Azuma's inequality for coin flips
Proof that 22/7 exceeds π
Solenoid (mathematics)
Sorgenfrey plane
Stein's example
Three cards and a top hat
Topologist's sine curve
Tsirelson space
Tutte eight cage
Weierstrass function
Wilkinson's polynomial
Wallpaper group
Uses of trigonometry (The "examples" in that article are not mathematical objects, i.e., numbers, functions, equations, sets, etc., but applications of trigonometry or scientific fields to which trigonometry is applied.)

Specialized lists of mathematical examples

List of algebraic surfaces  
List of curves  
List of complexity classes  
List of examples in general topology
List of finite simple groups  
List of Fourier-related transforms  
List of mathematical functions  
List of knots  
List of mathematical knots and links  
List of manifolds  
List of mathematical shapes  
List of matrices  
List of numbers  
List of polygons, polyhedra and polytopes  
List of prime numbers  —not merely a numerical table, but a list of various kinds of prime numbers, each with a table
List of regular polytopes  
List of surfaces  
List of small groups  
Table of Lie groups

Sporadic groups
See also list of finite simple groups.

Baby Monster group
Conway group
Fischer groups
Harada–Norton group
Held group
Higman–Sims group
Janko groups
Lyons group
The Mathieu groups
McLaughlin group
Monster group
O'Nan group
Rudvalis group
Suzuki sporadic group
Thompson group

See also
Counterexample
List of examples in general topology

 
Examples